The Storkenkopf is the second-highest summit of the Vosges Mountains. It is located in the French region of Alsace, close to the Grand Ballon.

Etymology 

In German and in Alsatian Storkenkopf means "storks' head".

Geography 
The mountain is divided between the French municipalities of Saint-Amarin, Geishouse, and Lautenbachzell, all belonging to the Haut-Rhin department. Near the mountain's top  is the ferme du Haag, a farm which also provides accommodation.

Access to the summit 

References 

Mountains of the Vosges
One-thousanders of France
Mountains of Haut-Rhin